Vicki Fergon (born September 29, 1955) is an American professional golfer who played on the LPGA Tour.

Fergon won three times on the LPGA Tour between 1979 and 1996.

Fergon played on the Women's Senior Golf Tour (now Legends Tour) starting in 2000. She won the 2000 Shopko Great Lakes Classic.

In 2003, Fergon also played on the Futures Tour, winning the IOS Futures Golf Classic, and became the first woman to win on all three LPGA-affiliated tours.

Professional wins (5)

LPGA Tour wins (3)

Legends Tour wins (1)
2000 Shopko Great Lakes Classic

Futures Tour wins (1)
2003 IOS Futures Golf Classic

References

External links

American female golfers
LPGA Tour golfers
Golfers from California
Sportspeople from Palo Alto, California
1955 births
Living people
21st-century American women